Dilshad Akhtar, sometimes spelled as Dilshad Akhter, was a Punjabi singer. He also worked as playback singer in many Punjabi films. Manpreet Akhtar, a singer of Punjab, was his sister.

Early life 

Akhtar was born in the Gilje WalaSri Muktsar Sahib town of Indian Punjab and learned music from his teacher in Faridkot.

References 

Punjabi-language singers
Punjabi people
Singers from Punjab, India